In a real spring–mass system, the spring has a non-negligible mass .

Ideal uniform spring

The effective mass of the spring in a spring-mass system when using an ideal spring of uniform linear density is 1/3 of the mass of the spring and is independent of the direction of the spring-mass system (i.e., horizontal, vertical, and oblique systems all have the same effective mass). This is because external acceleration does not affect the period of motion around the equilibrium point.

The effective mass of the spring can be determined by finding its kinetic energy. This requires adding all the mass elements' kinetic energy, and requires the following integral, where  is the velocity of mass element:

Since the spring is uniform, where  is the length of the spring at the time of measuring the speed. Hence,

The velocity of each mass element of the spring is directly proportional to length from the position where it is attached (if near to the block then more velocity and if near to the ceiling then less velocity), i.e. , from which it follows:
 

Comparing to the expected original kinetic energy formula  the effective mass of spring in this case is m/3. Using this result, the total energy of system can be written in terms of the displacement  from the spring's unstretched position (ignoring constant potential terms and taking the upwards direction as positive):

 (Total energy of system)

Note that  here is the acceleration of gravity along the spring. By differentiation of the equation with respect to time, the equation of motion is:

The equilibrium point  can be found by letting the acceleration be zero:

Defining , the equation of motion becomes:

This is the equation for a simple harmonic oscillator with period:

So the effective mass of the spring added to the mass of the load gives us the "effective total mass" of the system that must be used in the standard formula  to determine the period of oscillation.

General case 
As seen above, the effective mass of a spring does not depend upon "external" factors such as the acceleration of gravity along it. In fact, for a non-uniform spring, the effective mass solely depends on its linear density  along its length:

So the effective mass of a spring is:

This result also shows that , with  occurring in the case of an unphysical spring whose mass is located purely at the end farthest from the support.

Real spring
The above calculations assume that the stiffness coefficient of the spring does not depend on its length. However, this is not the case for real springs. Jun-ichi Ueda and Yoshiro Sadamoto have found that as  increases beyond 7, the effective mass of a spring in a vertical spring-mass system becomes smaller than Rayleigh's value  and eventually reaches negative values. This unexpected behavior of the effective mass can be explained in terms of the elastic after-effect (which is the spring's not returning to its original length after the load is removed).

See also
Simple harmonic motion (SHM) examples.
Reduced mass

References

External links
http://tw.knowledge.yahoo.com/question/question?qid=1405121418180
http://tw.knowledge.yahoo.com/question/question?qid=1509031308350
https://web.archive.org/web/20110929231207/http://hk.knowledge.yahoo.com/question/article?qid=6908120700201
https://web.archive.org/web/20080201235717/http://www.goiit.com/posts/list/mechanics-effective-mass-of-spring-40942.htm
http://www.juen.ac.jp/scien/sadamoto_base/spring.html
"The Effective Mass of an Oscillating Spring"  Am. J. Phys., 38, 98 (1970)
"Effective Mass of an Oscillating Spring" The Physics Teacher, 45, 100 (2007)

Mechanical vibrations
Mass